Massimiliano "Massi" Rosolino (born 11 July 1978) is an Italian retired competitive swimmer.

Biography
Born in Naples to an Italian father, Salvatore, and an Australian mother, Carolyn, he moved to Australia at the age of three, coming back to Italy at six. Rosolino declared about his beginnings as a swimmer:
I learned to float by sheer chance at the age of 4. Instead of the common arm floating bands, they made me swim with a headboard. Unfortunately it had a hole, and by the time I finally got out of the small and deep pool, the headboard had drowned... The first real swimming course I took was when I was 6 years old, and after that, lesson by lesson, I got to the pre-competition level. I always had a hard life, even though I was physically well-built, I always had to fight to become number 1, and even though I won a lot of races, I remember every race with emotion: the first regional championships, the national ones, the Young Europeans, and of course all the stomach aches I had.

In 2002 he moved back to Australia to train with coach Ian Pope at the Melbourne Vicentre Club.

Rosolino represented Italy in all of the four editions of the Olympic Games since 1996. At the 2000 Olympic Games in Sydney, he became the second Olympic champion ever in the history of Italian swimming as he won the gold medal in the 200 m individual medley (1:58.98, then Olympic and national record). He won two more medals: a silver medal in the 400 m freestyle setting the current European record (3:43.40) behind Ian Thorpe, and a bronze medal in the 200 m freestyle (1:46.65) behind Pieter van den Hoogenband and Ian Thorpe. At the 2004 Olympic Games in Athens, Rosolino won a bronze medal with the Italian team in the 4×200 m freestyle relay.

Rosolino is the most successful athlete in the history of Italian swimming, with an overall count of 60 international medals. He became world champion in the 200 m individual medley at the 2001 World Championships in Fukuoka. He also won 3 silver medals and a bronze medal through 5 editions of the World Long Course Championships. He won a gold medal (4×200 m freestyle relay), 2 silver medals and 7 bronze medals at the World Short Course Championships; since 1995 he won 21 medals at the European LC Championships and 20 medals at the European Short Course Swimming Championships, becoming European champion 14 times (7 long course, 7 short course).

Personal bests
Rosolino's personal bests are:

 100 m freestyle LC: 49.35 r (2007; World Championships in Melbourne).
 200 m freestyle LC: 1:46.60 sf (2000, Italian record; Olympic Games in Sydney).
 400 m freestyle LC: 3:43.40 (2000, European record; Olympic Games in Sydney).
 800 m freestyle LC: 7:50.40 (2005).
 1500 m freestyle LC: 15:09.28 (2001).
 50 m breaststroke LC: 29.29 (2004).
 100 m breaststroke LC: 1:03.81 (2003).
 200 m individual medley LC: 1:58.98 (2000; Olympic Games in Sydney).
 400 m individual medley LC: 4:17.30 (2003; World Championships in Barcelona).

See also
 Italian swimmers multiple medalists at the international competitions
 Walk of Fame of Italian sport

References

External links
 
  

1978 births
Living people
Italian male breaststroke swimmers
Italian male medley swimmers
Olympic swimmers of Italy
Swimmers at the 1996 Summer Olympics
Swimmers at the 2000 Summer Olympics
Swimmers at the 2004 Summer Olympics
Swimmers at the 2008 Summer Olympics
Swimmers from Naples
Olympic gold medalists for Italy
Olympic silver medalists for Italy
Olympic bronze medalists for Italy
Italian people of Australian descent
Olympic bronze medalists in swimming
Italian male freestyle swimmers
World Aquatics Championships medalists in swimming
Medalists at the FINA World Swimming Championships (25 m)
European Aquatics Championships medalists in swimming
European champions for Italy
Medalists at the 2004 Summer Olympics
Medalists at the 2000 Summer Olympics
Olympic gold medalists in swimming
Olympic silver medalists in swimming
Mediterranean Games gold medalists for Italy
Swimmers at the 1997 Mediterranean Games
Swimmers at the 2005 Mediterranean Games
Goodwill Games medalists in swimming
Mediterranean Games medalists in swimming
Competitors at the 1998 Goodwill Games
20th-century Italian people
21st-century Italian people